The 1996 AC Delco 400 was the 29th stock car race of the 1996 NASCAR Winston Cup Series and the 22nd iteration of the event. The race was held on Sunday, October 20, 1996, in Rockingham, North Carolina, at North Carolina Speedway, a  permanent high-banked racetrack. The race took the scheduled 393 laps to complete. At race's end, Ricky Rudd, driving for his own Rudd Performance Motorsports team, would manage to dominate the late stages of the race to take his 17th career NASCAR Winston Cup Series victory and his only victory of the season. Meanwhile, third-place finisher, Hendrick Motorsports driver Terry Labonte, would manage to overtake the points lead from teammate Jeff Gordon, leading Gordon by 32 points. To fill out the top three, Robert Yates Racing driver Dale Jarrett would finish second.

Background 

North Carolina Speedway was opened as a flat, one-mile oval on October 31, 1965. In 1969, the track was extensively reconfigured to a high-banked, D-shaped oval just over one mile in length. In 1997, North Carolina Motor Speedway merged with Penske Motorsports, and was renamed North Carolina Speedway. Shortly thereafter, the infield was reconfigured, and competition on the infield road course, mostly by the SCCA, was discontinued. Currently, the track is home to the Fast Track High Performance Driving School.

Entry list 

 (R) denotes rookie driver.

Qualifying 
Qualifying was split into two rounds. The first round was held on Friday, October 18, at 2:00 PM EST. Each driver would have one lap to set a time. During the first round, the top 25 drivers in the round would be guaranteed a starting spot in the race. If a driver was not able to guarantee a spot in the first round, they had the option to scrub their time from the first round and try and run a faster lap time in a second round qualifying run, held on Saturday, October 19, at 9:30 AM EST. As with the first round, each driver would have one lap to set a time. For this specific race, positions 26-32 would be decided on time, and depending on who needed it, a select amount of positions were given to cars who had not otherwise qualified but were high enough in owner's points.

Three drivers would fail to qualify: Ed Berrier, Norm Benning, and Terry Byers.

Full qualifying results

Race results

References 

1996 NASCAR Winston Cup Series
NASCAR races at Rockingham Speedway
October 1996 sports events in the United States
1996 in sports in North Carolina